Leif Enger is an American author who wrote the novel Peace Like a River.  

Enger was born in 1961 and was raised in Osakis, Minnesota. Since his teens, he wanted to write fiction.  He worked as a reporter and producer for Minnesota Public Radio from 1984 until the sale of Peace Like a River to publisher Grove/Atlantic allowed him to take time off to write.  In the early 1990s, he and his older brother, Lin, writing under the pen name L.L. Enger, produced a series of mystery novels featuring a retired baseball player.

Peace Like a River, published in 2001, has been described as "high-spirited and unflagging" and has received some notable acclaim in literary circles.

His second novel, So Brave, Young, and Handsome appeared in May 2008. It was called, “A superbly written, utterly compelling story of self-discovery and redemption disguised as a cracking good adventure tale . . . Enger has created a work of great humanity and huge heart, a riveting piece of fiction that while highly accessible is never shallow. This story of an ordinary man's discovery of who he is and his place in the world is exciting, admirable and ultimately very affecting. . ..After reading the final page, don't be surprised if you find yourself shaking your head and murmuring, Wow. What a good book.″—Peter Moore, Minneapolis Star Tribune

In October 2018 his third novel, Virgil Wander, was published by Grove Press.

He is married to his wife Robin, and lives with his wife and two sons.

References

External links
Official Leif Enger Website
Interview with Leif Enger
Info about Leif Enger

Writers from Minnesota
American male writers
Living people
1961 births
People from Douglas County, Minnesota